XII is an album by American country music singer Neal McCoy. Released on March 6, 2012, by Blaster Records, it is his first album of new material since That's Life in 2005. Blake Shelton and Miranda Lambert co-produced the album with Brent Rowan. The album includes the single "A-OK".

Critical reception
Matt Bjorke of Roughstock gave the album three-and-a-half stars out of five, saying that it "finds him doing what he does best, performing nimble mainstream country music tunes as good as anything else on the marketplace." Rating it four stars out of five, Taste of Country writer Billy Dukes favorably compared McCoy's vocals to Shelton's. J. Poet of Allmusic rated it three stars out of five, saying that the album had "one great tune, two good ones, and a whole lot that get by on McCoy's powerful vocals".

Track listing

Personnel
Perry Coleman – background vocals
Eric Darken – percussion
Scott Ducaj – trumpet
Dan Dugmore – dobro, electric guitar, steel guitar, lap steel guitar
Lester Estelle Jr. – drums
David Grissom – electric guitar
Aubrey Haynie – fiddle
Wes Hightower – background vocals
John Barlow Jarvis – piano
Kim Keyes – background vocals
Miranda Lambert – background vocals
Tim Lauer – organ, synthesizer, Wurlitzer
Mac McAnally – acoustic guitar
Neal McCoy – lead vocals, whistle
Greg Morrow – drums, percussion
Wendy Moten – background vocals
Michael Rhodes – bass guitar
Mike Rojas – piano
Brent Rowan – bass guitar, acoustic guitar, electric guitar, piano, sitar
Blake Shelton – acoustic guitar, background vocals
Bryan Sutton – banjo, acoustic guitar, resonator guitar
Glenn Worf – bass guitar

Charts

References

2012 albums
Neal McCoy albums
Albums produced by Brent Rowan